Easy Does It is a 1968 album by singer Julie London.

By 1967, Julie London was on her way to exiting her long-term contract with Liberty Records. The album was released by Liberty Records under catalog number LRP-3546 as a monophonic recording and LST-7546 as a stereophonic.

Track listing

 "Show Me the Way to Go Home"* - (Irving King aka Jimmy Campbell and Reg Connelly) - 2:39
 "Me and My Shadow"* - (Dave Dreyer, Billy Rose, Al Jolson) - 3:00
 "This Can't Be Love"* - (Richard Rodgers, Lorenz Hart) - 3:31
 "Spring Will Be a Little Late This Year"** - (Frank Loesser) - 2:55
 "Soon It's Gonna Rain"* - (Harvey Schmidt, Tom Jones) - 2:43
 "I'll See You in My Dreams"** - (Isham Jones, Gus Kahn) - 3:41- 
 "April in Paris" - (Vernon Duke, Yip Harburg) - 3:20
 "Bidin' My Time" - (George Gershwin, Ira Gershwin) - 3:50
 "The Man I Love" - (George Gershwin, Ira Gershwin) - 3:29
 "It Had to Be You" - (Isham Jones, Gus Kahn) - 3:34
 "We'll Be Together Again" - (Carl T. Fischer, Frankie Laine) - 2:59
 "The One I Love Belongs to Someone Else" - (Isham Jones, Gus Kahn) - 2:26

Personnel
 Julie London - vocals
 Kirk Stuart - piano, organ, arranger
 John Gray - guitar
 Don Bagley - double bass, arranger*
 Earl Palmer - drums
 Allyn Ferguson - arranger**

Notes

References

Liberty Records albums
1968 albums
Julie London albums
Albums arranged by Allyn Ferguson